Şıxlar (also, Shykhlyar and Shikhlyar) is a village and municipality in the Jalilabad Rayon of Azerbaijan.  It has a population of 508.

References 

Populated places in Jalilabad District (Azerbaijan)